This is a list of notable and recurring sketches from the comedy group, Monty Python, for their series Monty Python's Flying Circus and other projects.

Albatross!
Anne Elk's Theory on Brontosauruses
Architects Sketch
Argument Clinic
 The Bishop
Cheese Shop sketch
Colin "Bomber" Harris vs Colin "Bomber" Harris
Crunchy Frog
Dead Bishop
Dead Parrot sketch
The Dirty Fork
Dirty Hungarian Phrasebook
Election Night Special
Fish Licence
The Fish-Slapping Dance
Four Yorkshiremen sketch
The Funniest Joke in the World
How Not to Be Seen
Kilimanjaro Expedition
Lifeboat sketch
Marriage Guidance Counsellor
The Ministry of Silly Walks
The Mouse Problem
Nudge Nudge
Patient Abuse
The Philosophers' Football Match
Piranha Brothers
Ron Obvious
Sam Peckinpah's "Salad Days"
Seduced Milkmen
Self-Defence Against Fresh Fruit
Spam
The Spanish Inquisition
Undertakers
Upper Class Twit of the Year
Vocational Guidance Counsellor
World Forum/Communist Quiz

References

External links